Juan Adolfo Orcí Martínez (born 4 June 1955) is a Mexican politician affiliated with the Party of the Democratic Revolution. As of 2014 he served as Deputy of the LX Legislature of the Mexican Congress representing Baja California Sur.

References

1955 births
Living people
Politicians from Sonora
Members of the Chamber of Deputies (Mexico)
Party of the Democratic Revolution politicians
21st-century Mexican politicians
People from Tubutama Municipality